The Ashland Harbor Breakwater lighthouse, also known as Ashland Breakwater Lighthouse, is an operational lighthouse located near Ashland in Ashland County, Wisconsin, USA. Located in Chequamegon Bay of Lake Superior, it is owned and managed by the National Park Service, and is a part of the Apostle Islands National Lakeshore. It sits at the end of a long and detached breakwater, which creates an artificial harbor.

There are additional living quarters on the second and third stories of the lighthouse.

Gallery

References

Further reading

 Havighurst, Walter (1943) The Long Ships Passing: The Story of the Great Lakes, Macmillan Publishers.
 Oleszewski, Wes, Great Lakes Lighthouses, American and Canadian: A Comprehensive Directory/Guide to Great Lakes Lighthouses, (Gwinn, Michigan: Avery Color Studios, Inc., 1998) .
 
 Wright, Larry and Wright, Patricia, Great Lakes Lighthouses Encyclopedia Hardback (Erin: Boston Mills Press, 2006) .

External links
 
Aerial photos of Ashland Harbor Breakwater Light, Marina.com.
Anderson, Kraig, Lighthouse friends, Ashland Harbor Breakwater Light article
Terry Pepper, Seeing the Light, Ashland Harbor Breakwater Light.

Wobser, David, Ashland Harbor Breakwater Light, Great Laker magazine , boatnerd.com

Lighthouses completed in 1915
Houses completed in 1915
Lighthouses in Ashland County, Wisconsin
Lighthouses on the National Register of Historic Places in Wisconsin
National Register of Historic Places in Ashland County, Wisconsin
Ashland, Wisconsin